R. Paul Dhillon is an Indo-Canadian journalist and head of MMM Films and Blueberry Street Motion Pictures.  Dhillon is also a film writer, director, producer and cinematographer.  Dhillon is a graduate of Simon Fraser University.

In addition to his work in film, Dhillon is the editor of British Columbia's oldest weekly newspaper, The Link. He received the Best National Editorial Award from the Ethnic Journalists Association in 2005 for his reportage on the Kanishka tragedy.

Filmography
 Sweet Amerika (2008), starring Bollywood icon Gulshan Grover and Canadian actors Remi Clair, Sian Sladen, Melanie Papalia, David Stuart and Kit Koon
 Planet Aaj (1997/98), a South Asian variety show shown on Baton Broadcasting's flagship Canadian National Television station VTV (now BC-CTV - Channel 9)
 Saint Soldier (1999/2000) - a one-hour documentary on B.C.'s Sikh community also for CTV
 Slices Of My Life (1992/93), a slice of the immigrant experience
 South Van Stud (1992), a play for Expressions '92 Youth Festival
 Autumn Leaves (1990/91), a short film which was selected at Montreal's Student Film Festival

Author credits
 The Fusion Generation
 Spiceland

References

External links
 
 Blueberry Street Films

Year of birth missing (living people)
Living people
Film directors from Vancouver
Indian emigrants to Canada
Journalists from British Columbia
Canadian people of Indian descent
Naturalized citizens of Canada 
People from Jalandhar
Punjabi people
Simon Fraser University alumni
Asian-Canadian filmmakers